Bernard Donald Kanan (November 26, 1924–August 7, 2006) was an American politician who served one term in the Kansas State Senate from 1989 to 1992. Born in Missouri, Kanan narrowly won the Democratic primary election for the 5th Senate district in 1988. He was unopposed in the general election, and took office in January of 1989.

He was the Democratic nominee for mayor of Kansas City, Kansas in the 1991 election, but lost the general election. In 1992, he ran for re-election to his Senate seat; he won the primary, but lost in the general election to Republican Alfred Ramirez. In 1995, he made another run for Kansas City mayor, but was defeated in the Democratic primary; it was his last run for office.

References

Democratic Party Kansas state senators
20th-century American politicians
Politicians from Kansas City, Kansas
1924 births
2006 deaths
People from Cameron, Missouri